Sporting Gun is a leading monthly sporting publication covering game and clay shooting. It is published by Future plc in London.

History and profile
Sporting Gun was established in 1978. The current editor is Matt Clark.

The headquarters of the magazine is in London.

References

External links
 

Monthly magazines published in the United Kingdom
Sports magazines published in the United Kingdom
Weekly magazines published in the United Kingdom
English-language magazines
Hunting and shooting in the United Kingdom
Magazines published in London
Magazines established in 1978